The Great 'H' of Scotland was a jewel belonging to Mary, Queen of Scots comprising a large diamond, a ruby, and a gold chain. It was broken up in 1604 and made into the Mirror of Great Britain for James VI and I.

Mary Queen of Scots
The "H" was a pendant known as the 'H' because of its form, and was also called the 'Great Harry'. It appears listed in an inventory of jewels belonging to Mary, Queen of Scots made in France in the 1550s, as a French crown jewel, and two of its stones were mentioned, a large facetted lozenge diamond which formed the bar of the 'H' and hanging below this a large cabochon ruby. It may have been the pendant of "incalculable value" which she wore at her wedding in 1558. Later Scottish inventories also mention the great diamond and pendant ruby, and a small gold chain and other diamonds. Mary was allowed to keep this jewel after the death of her husband Francis II of France and brought it to Scotland. In 1578 it was described as:The jowell callit the greit Hary with the letter H contening a grit diament and a grit ruby.

The jewel, as its name suggests, may have been a present from Henri II of France, and a similar jewel was listed in an inventory of French crown jewels made in 1551. It has sometimes been suggested the Great H was a gift from Henry VII to Margaret Tudor, mother of James V of Scotland. James V, Mary's father, owned a different 'H' jewel, a hat badge with a ruby and two figures with the letter 'H', possibly a gift from Henry VIII of England, or a jewel formerly belonging to Margaret Tudor.

Mary hoped to add the "Great H" to the crown jewels of Scotland in memory of her reign, in a list of potential bequests she made in childbed in 1566. She left a second lesser gold "H" which included a cabochon ruby and a pendant pearl to Lord Darnley.

Regent Moray, Regent Morton, and the Earl of Arran

After Mary's abdication, her half-brother Regent Moray brought the jewel to England hoping to sell it. His agent Nicolas Elphinstone sold Mary's pearls to Queen Elizabeth. After Regent Moray was assassinated by James Hamilton of Bothwellhaugh, his widow Agnes Keith retained the "H" for several years, despite requests from Mary Queen of Scots, and her agent, the Earl of Huntly, Regent Lennox, and his successor, Regent Morton. Both the Queen's Party and the King's Party of the Marian Civil War wanted the "H" and other jewels in the countess' hands.

Agnes Keith wrote from Dunnotar on 2 November 1570 to William Cecil asking him to intercede with Queen Elizabeth so that Mary would cease from urging Huntly to trouble her and her children for the jewels, and claimed she did not know at first that the jewels were Mary's. She also wanted Elizabeth to write to Regent Lennox, asking him not to requisition the jewels. The English ambassador Thomas Randolph wrote to Cecil on her behalf, saying her friends advised her to yield to neither side. She later claimed that the value of the jewels was just recompense for the expenses her husband had made as Regent of Scotland. Eventually she returned the "H" to Morton on 5 March 1575. A list of the returned jewels made at this time mentions the "H callit the great Hary" as a jewel set with three diamonds and three rubies, a description differing from other references.

It has been suggested that a portrait of the Countess of Moray depicts her wearing the queen's jewels, with crowns in her hair band, and the jewel worn at her neck includes a large cabochon ruby like that of the Great Harry. However, the picture is usually regarded as a marriage portrait made earlier in the 1560s.

Esmé Stewart, Duke of Lennox and James Stewart, Earl of Arran

After James VI came of age, in 1581 he ordered the treasurer, William Ruthven, 1st Earl of Gowrie to give several jewels from his mother's collection to his favourite, Esmé Stewart, 1st Duke of Lennox including, in June, a gold chain of knots of pearls and diamonds. In October Lennox received a gold cross with diamonds and rubies, a chain of rubies, a carcan necklace of diamonds and gold roses, fore and back garnishings for a woman's head dress and other pieces that had belonged to Mary, Queen of Scots, with the Great H, which was detailed as:the greit Hary with the letter H contenand a greit dyamant and a greit ruby The receipt was signed by witnesses including Elizabeth Stewart and Alexander Hay of Easter Kennet. Lennox returned the jewels when he left for France in 1583.

In 1585 the former royal favourite James Stewart, Earl of Arran was said to have embarked on a boat at Ayr carrying royal jewellery including 'Kingis Eitche', but he was forced to give his treasure up to Sir William Stewart aboard ship in the coastal water known as the Fairlie Road. Stewart brought it to the King and the jewel was receipted by Sir George Home. It was noted that William Stewart had negotiated the recovery of the jewels, and delivered the "H" into the "king's own hands". The jewels recovered from the Earl of Arran and his wife Elizabeth Stewart, including the "H" were finally formally returned to the treasurer of Scotland, Robert Melville on 23 February 1586.

James VI and I
James VI gave the 'H' to Anne of Denmark to wear, possibly among a gift of the "greatest part of his jewels" mentioned in December 1593. However, in September 1594 King James pawned the jewel with the goldsmith Thomas Foulis for £12,000 Scots, or £2000 Sterling. With the "H" was a small two inch gold chain. It was noted that the large diamond was in the centre "the middis of the same H". Foulis would be repaid from money sent to James VI by Elizabeth I, now known as the "English subsidy".

James VI needed the money for his military expedition to the north of Scotland against the Earl of Huntly and the Earl of Erroll. The English diplomat George Nicholson heard that Anne of Denmark had offered the "H" to her friend the Countess of Erroll as recompense for the demolition of Slains Castle. Nicholson heard that Foulis had a breakdown in January 1598 when James reclaimed the jewel without payment.

King James brought the "H" to England, with other jewels deemed to be important, including the "espousall ring of Denmark". In 1604 or 1605 the jewel was dismantled and the large diamond was used in the new Mirror of Great Britain which James wore as a hat badge. The Mirror of Great Britain included the Sancy Diamond, for which the French ambassador Christophe de Harlay, comte de Beaumont was paid 60,000 French crowns.

The remaining components of the Great 'H' were mentioned in 1606 when George Home, now Earl of Dunbar, gave up the office of Master of the Wardrobe and delivered to James Hay, master of the robes, the rest of the jewel including the chain and ruby.

Other royal "H" jewels
Arbella Stuart had an "H" of gold set with a rock ruby, among jewels bequeathed to her by her grandmother Margaret Douglas. Her mother's executor Thomas Fowler took these pieces to Scotland and died in April 1590 while James VI was in Denmark. Francis Stewart, 5th Earl of Bothwell obtained Arbella's jewels and seems to have delivered them to the king. This "H" may have belonged to Margaret Tudor, sister of Henry VIII, and wife of James IV of Scotland.

King James gave an "old jewel" in the form of an 'H' from the royal collection to Frances Howard, Duchess of Richmond on 11 March 1623. This jewel had two pointed diamonds, six table cut diamonds, and three pendant pearls, and was kept in a crimson box in the secret jewel house of the Tower of London. King James had previously given this jewel to Anna of Denmark in 1607, and she also had another "H" jewel with rubies and diamonds.

Prince Henry had yet another "H" jewel, described after his death as "a ballas ruby in form of an H with pearls upon every side, with a great pearl hanging thereto." It is not clear if this was newly made for Henry or was another heirloom piece.

In 1540 Henry VIII gave Katherine Howard an "hache of gold wherin is vj feir diamondes" with an emerald and four pendant pearls, which differs from the pieces described above. Among jewels with the letters "H" and "K" in a coffer marked as the "Queen's Jewels" in 1547 was an "H" with seven diamonds and three pendant pearls.

Anne Seymour, Duchess of Somerset who died in 1587, owned "a fair square tablet of gold like an H, with four diamonds, and a rock ruby or ballas in the midst, garnished with pearl, with a pearl pendant".

References

Crown Jewels of the United Kingdom
Court of James VI and I
Court of Mary, Queen of Scots
Individual items of jewellery
16th century in Scotland
Scottish jewellery
Material culture of royal courts